Rodney Goggins (born 25 March 1978) is an Irish former professional snooker player from County Wexford. He competed on the main tour between 2004 and 2009.

Career

At the age of 21, Goggins won the International Billiards and Snooker Federation World Under-21 Championship in 1999, when he beat Rolf de Jong of the Netherlands 11–4 in the final in Egypt.

Two last-32 finishes in qualifying events during the 2003–2004 season earned Goggins a place on the professional main tour for 2004–2005. That season, his best performance was a run to the last 64 at the 2005 Irish Masters, where he beat Shokat Ali and Bjorn Haneveer, both 5–2, before losing by the same scoreline to Dave Harold. Goggins finished the season ranked 90th, and lost his place on tour.

Having finished first in the Irish senior rankings for 2006–2007, Goggins returned to the professional game in 2007. That season brought progress to the last 64 at the 2007 UK Championship, with victories over Alex Davies and Judd Trump before a 3–9 defeat to David Gray. In the 2008 World Championship, he beat Ian Barry Stark and Lee Spick, but lost 4–10 to Trump at the last-80 stage.

Goggins' fortunes did not improve the following season; again, the last 64 at the UK Championship was his best performance, being defeated 3–9 by Gerard Greene. He concluded the season ranked 70th, a career-highest, but as only the top 64 automatically retained their places on tour, he was relegated as a result.

In 2018 he was runner up to Michael Judge in the Irish Amateur Championships.

Performance and rankings timeline

References

1978 births
Living people
Irish snooker players
People from County Wexford